NBCUniversal International Networks, formerly NBC Universal Global Networks and Universal Networks International, is a part of NBCUniversal, owned by Comcast.

History
When NBCUniversal was formed in 2004, it owned many entertainment television channels in Europe and Latin America. These were mostly a few international versions of the Sci Fi Channel, three action and suspense series channels in Europe, the Italian Studio Universal channel and the Latin American version of the USA Network.

In 2007, NBC Universal acquired Sparrowhawk Media Group, which at the time was a British private equity-backed media company managing a collection of digital television channels, and integrated it into NBC Universal Global Networks. The purchase more than doubled the number of international channels in NBC Universal's portfolio. Sparrowhawk's crown jewel was an international network of drama channels available on most continents under the Hallmark Channel brand, but Diva TV, Movies 24, and KidsCo channels were also available.

Altogether, the company broadcast about 70 different channels by 2009. On 5 October 2009, it was announced that the venture would be renamed Universal Networks International and focus its attention on five channel brands, all with "Universal" in their name:
Universal Channel
13th Street Universal
Syfy Universal
Diva Universal
Studio Universal

The overhaul started in late 2009 and progressed during 2010. Most of the international Sci Fi channels were rebranded as Syfy. The Hallmark Channel brand was also phased out in most markets during 2010. Typically, it was replaced by the Universal Channel brand in markets where that brand wasn't available before. In many markets where Universal Channel was already present, Hallmark Channel was replaced by Diva Universal with one each replaced by Studio Universal or 13th Street Universal.

Following the merger of NBCUniversal and Comcast in 2011, the following channels are also operated and distributed by NBCUniversal:
E! Entertainment Television
Style Network
The Golf Channel

The DreamWorks Channel was placed under the NBCU International executive vice president, lifestyle and kids Duccio Donati in August 2017. This paired the channel with E! international channels and NBCU lifestyle channel content. On 1 January 2018, NBCUniversal International Networks took over HBO Asia's role with DreamWorks Channel in Southeast Asia.

Following NBCU parent company, Comcast acquisition of Sky Group in 2018, NBCUniversal International Networks took over the sales, marketing and distribution rights to Sky News outside UK and Ireland from Fox Networks Group International.

Channels

Australia and New Zealand
7Bravo (Australia only)
 Bravo (New Zealand only)
 CNBC
MSNBC International (Australia only)
 Universal TV
Australia
New Zealand
 DreamWorks Channel (Australia only)
 Oxygen
Former:
 E!
 Euronews
 KidsCo
 13th Street
Style Network
SYFY

Europe
 13th Street
 CNBC Europe
 E!
 Golf Channel
 Sky News
 Syfy

France
In December 2016, SFR got an exclusivity agreement with NBCUniversal for channels and films (on Altice Studio)
 13ème Rue Universal
 SYFY France
 E!

Germany, Austria, Scandinavia, and Switzerland
 13th Street
 SYFY 
 Universal TV

Former:
 Das Vierte
 E!

Italy
 Class CNBC (joint venture with Class Editori (60%) and Mediaset (20%))

Former:
 Studio Universal
 Steel
 Syfy (branded block on Steel)
 Diva Universal

Netherlands
 DreamWorks Channel

Former:
 13th Street
 Hallmark Channel
 Syfy

Poland
 13 Ulica
 SciFi Universal

Former:
 Movies 24
 Universal Channel

Romania
 Diva
 E!

Former:
 Movies 24
 Universal Channel

Serbia, Montenegro, Albania, Croatia, Slovenia, and Macedonia
 Diva Adria
 SciFi Universal Poland

Spain & Portugal
 Calle 13 (Spain only)
 DreamWorks Channel (Spain only)
 SYFY Spain 
 SYFY Portugal

United Kingdom and Ireland

 Sky Sci-Fi - formerly SyFy, rebranded as part of the Sky Group
 Movies 24
 Movies 24 +

Former:
Universal TV

Former channels in Europe
 Euronews (25%)
 Universal Channel (Hungary)
 Universal Channel (Czech Republic and Slovakia)
 Movies 24 (Poland, Romania and Hungary)
 Universal Channel (Russia)
 Diva Universal (Russia)
 KidsCo Europe
 Hallmark Channel

Middle East and North Africa
 E! 
 CNBC Arabiya
 CNBC Europe
 DreamWorks Channel
 SYFY 
 MSNBC (Displays in most of the time on OSN News)
 Sky News

Latin America
NBCUniversal International Networks Spanish Latin America (minority-owned by Ole Communications, networks distributed by Ole Distribution)
Universal TV 
Universal+
Universal Premiere
Universal Cinema
Universal Comedy
Universal Crime
Universal Reality
Studio Universal
Syfy 
E! (also available in Brazil)
Telemundo Internacional
DreamWorks Channel
CNBC
NBCUniversal International Networks Brasil (joint-venture with Globo, which also handles distribution)
Universal TV Brazil
Studio Universal Brazil
Syfy Brazil
DreamWorks Channel Brazil

Japan
 Nikkei CNBC (joint venture with Nikkei, Inc., TV Tokyo, and Jupiter TV)
 Sky News

South Korea
 DreamWorks Channel
 Sky News

Southeast Asia
CNBC Asia
CNBC Indonesia (licensed to Trans Media)
JKN-CNBC (licensed to JKN Global Group)
Golf Channel (Except Malaysia)
DreamWorks Channel
Sky News (Except Philippines)
Former:
Diva (HD) (ceased transmission broadcasts on New Year's Eve 2019 at 11.59pm together with E!)
E! (HD) (ceased transmission broadcasts on New Year's Eve 2019 at 11.59pm together with Diva)
Euronews
KidsCo Asia
Style Network
SYFY Asia 
Universal Channel Asia

South Asia

CNBC-TV18 (joint venture with TV18)
CNBC Awaaz (joint venture with TV18)
 CNBC Prime
 CNBC Bajar
Golf Channel  
Sky News
Former:
CNBC Pakistan (licensed to Vision Network Television Limited) 
Euronews
E! (HD)

Sub-Saharan Africa
 Universal TV Africa 
 Studio Universal Africa 
 SYFY Africa 
 MSNBC Africa
 CNBC Europe
 Telemundo
 CNBC Africa (licensed to Africa Business News)
 E!
 DreamWorks Channel
 Sky News

United States and Canada 
CNBC
CNBC World
MSNBC
SYFY
E! 
E! Canada (available in Canada, franchisely operated by Bell Media)
Bravo! 
Golf Channel 
Universal Kids 
Telemundo
Sky News

High Definition
On the January 26, 2009, Sci Fi became the first of the NBC Universal Global Network channels to begin broadcasting in High Definition within the UK. It will provide a simulcast of the Sci Fi Channel exclusively on Sky+HD channel 214, and will air UK HD premieres such as Eli Stone and Flash Gordon.

Video on demand
NBCUniversal International introduced Hayu in March 2016 in the United Kingdom. The subscription video on demand service offers reality programs such as Keeping Up with the Kardashians and The Real Housewives.

References

External links
Official Site

 
NBCUniversal networks